Trentino Project (PT) is a regionalist and Christian-democratic political party active in Trentino, Italy.

History
PT was formed in July 2012 as a split, led by former regional minister Silvano Grisenti, from the Union for Trentino (UpT).

In the 2013 provincial election the party supported Diego Mosna, entrepreneur and president of Trentino Volley, for President. Mosna was endorsed also by the Trentino Civic List, Stop the Decline, Administer Trentino, Together for Autonomy and Autonomy 2020. Mosna won a mere 19.3% of the vote and was trounced by Ugo Rossi of the Trentino Tyrolean Autonomist Party, who garnered a landslide 58.1%. PT however emerged as the fourth largest political force of Trentino, by winning 9.0% of the vote (the UpT got 13.3%) and four provincial councillors plus Mosna, who was elected as defeated candidate.

In December 2014, during the party's first congress, Marco Bettega was elected president to replace Mauro Dorigoni.

In March 2015 Grisenti was convicted of corruption and, consequently, abandoned politics. The PT participated in the successive Trento municipal election in coalition with Lega Nord Trentino (LNT), Trentino Civic List (CT), Forza Italia and the Brothers of Italy: in the event, the party won 3.8% of the vote, less than most of its coalition parties.

In January 2016, during the party's second congress, Marino Simoni was elected as new president. In April the PT signed a federative pact with the Populars for Italy (PpI), a minor Christian-democratic party represented in Parliament.

In the 2018 provincial election the PT was part of the autonomist centre-right coalition. Maurizio Fugatti of the LNT was elected President of Trentino and PT, with its 3.2%, was the coalition's third largest party. PT's Mario Tonina was appointed acting Vice President by Fugatti: after the death of CT's Rodolfo Borga (who was supposed to function as Vice President, due to CT's higher score in the election, 4.6%), Tonina's appointment became permanent.

Leadership
President: Mauro Dorigoni (2012–2014), Marco Bettega (2014–2016), Marino Simoni (2016–present)

References

External links
Official website

Political parties in Trentino
Political parties established in 2012
Christian democratic parties in Italy
Catholic political parties
2012 establishments in Italy